The Diverting History of John Gilpin Shewing how he went Farther than he intended, and came safe Home again is a comic ballad by William Cowper written in 1782. The ballad concerns a draper called John Gilpin who rides a runaway horse. Cowper heard the story from Lady Anna Austen at a time of severe depression, and it cheered him up so much that he put it into verse. 
The poem was published anonymously in the Public Advertiser in 1782, and then published with The Task in 1785. It was very popular, to the extent that "pirate copies were being sold all across the country, together with Gilpin books and toys."

The poem was republished in 1878, illustrated by Randolph Caldecott and printed by Edmund Evans. Caldecott's image of Gilpin riding the horse is the basis for the design of the obverse of the Caldecott Medal.

Randolph Caldecott's illustrations of The Diverting History of John Gilpin

References

External links

The Diverting History of JOHN GILPIN at the Eighteenth-Century Poetry Archive (ECPA)
Complete text

Poetry by William Cowper
1782 poems
Ballads